SNF may refer to:

Organizations
 National League of Sweden (previously Sveriges Nationella Förbund), youth organisation
 SNF Floerger, polyacrylamide manufacturer
 Somali National Front, a political armed movement
 Swiss National Science Foundation (Schweizerischer Nationalfonds zur Förderung der wissenschaftlichen Forschung)

Transport
 Shenfield railway station (station code SNF), Essex, England
 Sub Teniente Nestor Arias Airport (IATA code: SNF), San Felipe, Yaracuy, Venezuela

Other uses
 NBC Sunday Night Football, TV by NBC, US
 Neurotransmitter sodium symporter (symbol: SNF), a family of proteins
 Saturday Night Football (UK TV programme), 2013–2016
 Server Normal Format, a bitmap font format used by X Window
 Skilled nursing facility
 Smith normal form
 Spent nuclear fuel